Citizens' Rights Association is a political party in Macau, China. In the Legislative Council election in 2005, it had 191 votes (0.15% of popular vote) and no seat.

See also
Elections in Macau
List of political parties in Macau
2005 Macau legislative election

Political parties in Macau